Zadkiel ('God is my Righteousness'), also known as Hasdiel, is an archangel in Jewish and Christian angelology.

Abraham sacrifice 
As an angel of mercy, some texts claim that Zadkiel is the unnamed biblical Angel of the Lord who holds back Abraham to prevent the patriarch from sacrificing his son, and because of this is usually shown holding a dagger. Other texts cite Michael or Tadhiel or some other angel as the angel intended, while others interpret the Angel of the Lord as a theophany.

Associated symbolism 
In Jewish mysticism and Western ritual magic, Zadkiel is associated with the planet Jupiter. The angel's position in the Sephirot is fourth, which corresponds to Chesed (Kindness).

See also
List of angels in theology
Zedek

Notes

References

Sources 

Individual angels
Archangels
Anglican saints
Coptic Orthodox saints